The Gulf, Mobile and Northern Railroad  was a railroad in the Southern United States. The first World War had forced government operation upon the company; and in 1919, when it became once more a free agent, it chose Isaac B. Tigrett to chart its new course. Tigrett, a native of Jackson, Tennessee, was president of the GM&N from 1920 and of its successor, the GM&O, from 1938 to 1952, and oversaw the development of the road from a nearly bankrupt operation into a thriving success.  He was the great-uncle of Hard Rock Cafe founder Isaac Tigrett, also a native of Jackson.

At the end of 1925 GM&N operated 466 miles of road and 574 miles of track; that year it reported 419 million ton-miles of revenue freight and 12 million passenger-miles.

On September 13, 1940, the GM&N was merged with the Mobile and Ohio Railroad to form the Gulf, Mobile and Ohio Railroad.

See also

 Rebel, lightweight streamline trains, built for the GM&N, by ACF
List of defunct Alabama railroads
List of defunct Kentucky railroads
List of defunct Louisiana railroads
List of defunct Mississippi railroads
List of defunct Tennessee railroads

Notes

References

External links

Defunct Alabama railroads
Defunct Kentucky railroads
Defunct Louisiana railroads
Defunct Mississippi railroads
Defunct Tennessee railroads
Former Class I railroads in the United States
Predecessors of the Gulf, Mobile and Ohio Railroad
Railway companies established in 1915
Railway companies disestablished in 1940
American companies established in 1915
American companies disestablished in 1940